In mathematics, the Siegel G-functions are a class of functions in transcendental number theory introduced by C. L. Siegel.  They satisfy a linear differential equation with polynomial coefficients, and the coefficients of their power series expansion lie in a fixed algebraic number field and have heights of at most exponential growth.

Definition

A Siegel G-function is a function given by an infinite power series

where the coefficients an all belong to the same algebraic number field, K, and with the following two properties.

 f is the solution to a linear differential equation with coefficients that are polynomials in z;
 the projective height of the first n coefficients is O(cn) for some fixed constant c > 0.

The second condition means the coefficients of f grow no faster than a geometric series. Indeed, the functions can be considered as generalisations of geometric series, whence the name G-function, just as E-functions are generalisations of the exponential function.

References

C. L. Siegel, "Über einige Anwendungen diophantischer Approximationen", Ges. Abhandlungen, I, Springer  (1966)

Analytic number theory